The Smith-Peterson House is a historic house at 32 Farlow Road in Newton, Massachusetts.  Built in 1902, the two-story house is one of the city's finest Georgian Revival structures.  The -story rectangular building has a hip roof and flanking two-story wings.  Its main facade has a massive central Greek portico with two-story columns and a fully pedimented gable with an oculus window in its tympanum.

The house was listed on the National Register of Historic Places in 1986, and included in the Farlow Hill Historic District in 1990.

References

Houses on the National Register of Historic Places in Newton, Massachusetts
Colonial Revival architecture in Massachusetts
Houses completed in 1902
Historic district contributing properties in Massachusetts
National Register of Historic Places in Newton, Massachusetts